Amanuel Yohannes Gamo (born 14 March 1999) is an Ethiopian professional footballer who plays as an midfielder for Ethiopian Premier League club Ethiopian Coffee and the Ethiopia national team.

International career
Yohannes made his international debut with the Ethiopia national team in a 1–1 friendly tie with Burundi on 2 September 2018.

References

External links
 
 

1999 births
Living people
Sportspeople from Addis Ababa
Ethiopian footballers
Ethiopia international footballers
Ethiopian Premier League players
Association football midfielders
Ethiopian Coffee S.C. players
2021 Africa Cup of Nations players